Air Vallée S.p.A. was an Italian charter and regional airline based in Rimini. In June 2016 it ceased all operations.

History 
Air Vallée was founded in June 1987 to promote the commercial development of Aosta Airport. In June 1988, a twice weekly link with Rome was started with a Beechcraft King Air C90. The C90 was replaced in October 1989 with a Cessna Citation I and another twin jet was acquired. Both were replaced by a Learjet 31 acquired in January 1992 and a Beechcraft King Air 200 was acquired in August 1993.

It operated scheduled services linking two destinations in Sardinia and six on mainland Italy, as well as charter services. Its main base was Aosta Airport, with hubs at Leonardo da Vinci Airport and Turin Caselle Airport. The airline's head office was in Aosta Airport in Saint-Christophe.

In the summer of 2010, Air Vallée restarted operations, offering domestic flights from Rimini as well as a weekly flight from Perugia to Olbia on Sardinia. A Dornier 328 Jet served these routes.

, the airline operated only charter flights but planned to resume scheduled flights from Foggia to Milan-Malpensa and Turin from 26 October 2014.

In June 2016 Air Vallée suspended its operations as ENAC retired the airline's licence. The airline's sole aircraft was returned to the lessor.
In early 2018, the company showed its new website with flights to Rimini, Catania, Pescara, Tirana and other airports around Europe.

Destinations 
As of October 2015, Air Vallée served the following destinations:
Albania
Tirana - Tirana International Airport Nënë Tereza

Greece
Corfu - Corfu International Airport seasonal charter

Italy
Bari - Bari Karol Wojtyła Airport charter
Brindisi - Brindisi – Salento Airport focus city
Catania - Catania-Fontanarossa Airport 
Pescara - Abruzzo Airport charter
Rimini - Federico Fellini International Airport

Fleet 
As of January 2016, the Air Vallée fleet consisted of the following aircraft:

See also
 List of defunct airlines of Italy

References

External links

 Official website

Defunct airlines of Italy
Airlines established in 1987
Airlines disestablished in 2016